The 2001–02 Czech First League, known as the Gambrinus liga for sponsorship reasons, was the ninth season of top-tier football in the Czech Republic.

Stadia and locations

League table

Results

Top goalscorers

See also
 2001–02 Czech Cup
 2001–02 Czech 2. Liga

References

  ČMFS statistics

Czech First League seasons
Czech
1